Héctor Rosendo Robles Fuentes (born 7 September 1971) is a Chilean coach and former footballer.

International career
Robles made 3 appearances for the Chile national team in 2001. In addition, he made an appearance for Chile B in the friendly match against Catalonia on 28 December 2001.

Coaching career
He has mainly developed his career with Santiago Wanderers as coach as well as Sport Director. In addition he have had steps with Universidad de Chile at youth level and Chile U20.

After working as Head of the technical staff of Deportes Antofagasta youth system, he assumed as the assistant coach of Jorge Garcés in Santiago Wanderers at the end of 2021.

Personal life
He is the father of the professional footballer Andrés Robles.

Honours

Player
Santiago Wanderers
Primera División de Chile (1): 2001

References

External links
 
 

1971 births
Living people
Footballers from Santiago
Chilean footballers
Club Deportivo Palestino footballers
Santiago Wanderers footballers
Coquimbo Unido footballers
Chilean Primera División players
Primera B de Chile players
Association football defenders
Chilean football managers
Santiago Wanderers managers
Chilean Primera División managers
Chile national under-20 football team managers